António Lobo Antunes, GCSE (born 1 September 1942) is a Portuguese novelist and retired medical doctor. He has been named as a contender for the Nobel Prize in Literature. He has been awarded the 2000 Austrian State Prize, the 2003 Ovid Prize, the 2005 Jerusalem Prize, the 2007 Camões Prize, and the 2008 Juan Rulfo Prize.

Life and career
António Lobo Antunes was born in Lisbon as the eldest of six sons of João Alfredo de Figueiredo Lobo Antunes (born 1915), prominent Neurologist and professor, close collaborator of Egas Moniz, Nobel Prize of physiology, and wife Maria Margarida Machado de Almeida Lima (born 1917). He is the brother of João Lobo Antunes and Manuel Lobo Antunes. 

At the age of seven he decided to be a writer, but when he was 16, his father sent him to the medical school of the University of Lisbon. He graduated as a medical doctor, later specializing in psychiatry. During this time he never stopped writing.

By the end of his education, Lobo Antunes had to serve with the Portuguese Army to take part in the Portuguese Colonial War (1961–1974). In a military hospital in Angola he became interested in the subjects of death and "the other."

Lobo Antunes came back from Africa in 1973. The Angolan War of Independence was the subject of many of his novels. He worked many months in Germany and Belgium.

In 1979, Lobo Antunes published his first novel, Memória de Elefante (Elephant's Memory), in which he told the story of his separation. Due to the success of his first novel, Lobo Antunes decided to devote his evenings to writing. He has been practicing psychiatry as well, mainly at the outpatients' unit at the Hospital Miguel Bombarda of Lisbon.

His style is considered to be very dense, heavily influenced by William Faulkner and Louis-Ferdinand Céline, and his books also tend to be on the long side.

He has published more than twenty novels, among the most important are Fado Alexandrino (1983), As Naus (1988) and O Manual dos Inquisidores (1996). His works have been translated into more than thirty languages.

He writes a biweekly newspaper column for Visão, a Portuguese magazine.

He was granted the Grand Cross of the Order of Saint James of the Sword.

Personal life
He married his first wife Maria José Xavier da Fonseca e Costa (1946–1999), the second of three daughters of José Hermano da Costa and wife Clara da Conceição de Barros Xavier da Fonseca e Costa, by whom he has two daughters: Maria José Lobo Antunes in 1971 and Joana Lobo Antunes in 1973. They were divorced.

His second wife (whom he also divorced) was Maria João Espírito Santo Bustorff Silva (born Lisbon, 13 August 1950), daughter of António Sérgio Carneiro Bustorff Silva and wife Ana Maria da Anunciação de Fátima de Morais Sarmento Cohen do Espírito Santo Silva, by whom she has one daughter: Maria Isabel Bustorff Lobo Antunes (born 1983).

He was married for the third time in 2010 to Cristina Ferreira de Almeida, daughter of João Carlos Ferreira de Almeida (Lisbon, 1941 – 2008) and wife Natércia Ribeiro da Silva.

Awards
 Prize of Portuguese Writers' Association (1985 and 1999)
 France Culture Prize (1996 and 1997)
 Rosalía de Castro Prize (1999)
 The Austrian State Prize for European Literature (2000)
 Ovid Prize, Romania (2003)
 Latin Union International Prize (2003)
 Jerusalem Prize (2005)
 Camões Prize (2007)
 Juan Rulfo Premio de Literatura en Lengua Romances (2008)
 France Commandeur de l'Ordre des Arts et des Lettres (2008)
 International Nonino Prize (2014)

Bibliography

The following published works (the novels and the books of chronicles) are considered canonical by the author himself.

Novels
 Memória de Elefante (1979). Elephant's Memory
 Os Cus de Judas (1979). Translated by Elizabeth Lowe as South of Nowhere (1983); later by Margaret Jull Costa as The Land at the End of the World (2011).
 Conhecimento do Inferno (1980). Knowledge of Hell, trans. Clifford E. Landers (2008).
 Explicação dos Pássaros (1981). An Explanation of the Birds, trans. Richard Zenith (1991).
 Fado Alexandrino (1983). Fado Alexandrino, trans. Gregory Rabassa (1990).
 Auto dos Danados (1985). Act of the Damned, trans. Richard Zenith (1993).
 As Naus (1988). The Return of the Caravels, trans. Gregory Rabassa (2003).
 Tratado das Paixões da Alma (1990). Treatise on the Passions of the Heart, first section translated by Richard Zenith (1994).
 A Ordem Natural das Coisas (1992). The Natural Order of Things, trans. Richard Zenith (2001).
 A Morte de Carlos Gardel (1994). The Death of Carlos Gardel
 O Manual dos Inquisidores (1996). The Inquisitors' Manual, trans. Richard Zenith (2004).
 O Esplendor de Portugal (1997). The Splendor of Portugal, trans. Rhett McNeil (2011).
 Exortação aos Crocodilos (1999). Warning to the Crocodiles, trans. Karen Sotelino (2021).
 Não Entres Tão Depressa Nessa Noite Escura (2000). Don't Enter That Dark Night So Fast
 Que Farei Quando Tudo Arde? (2001). What Can I Do When Everything's on Fire?, trans. Gregory Rabassa (2008).
 Boa Tarde às Coisas Aqui em Baixo (2003). Good Evening to the Things From Here Below
 Eu Hei-de Amar uma Pedra (2004). I Shall Love a Stone
 Ontem Não te vi em Babilónia (2006). Didn't See You in Babylon Yesterday
 O Meu Nome é Legião (2007). My Name Is Legion
 O Arquipélago da Insónia (2008). Archipelago of Insomnia
 Que Cavalos São Aqueles Que Fazem Sombra no Mar? (2009). What Horses Are Those That Make Shade On The Sea?
 Sôbolos Rios Que Vão (2010).
 Comissão das Lágrimas (2011).
 Não é Meia-Noite quem quer (2012).
 Caminha Como Numa Casa em Chamas (2014).
 Da Natureza dos Deuses (2015).
 Para Aquela que Está Sentada no Escuro à Minha Espera (2016).
 Até Que as Pedras Se Tornem Mais Leves Que a Água (2016). Until Stones Become Lighter Than Water, trans. Jeffe Love (2019). 

Books of chronicles

Compilations featuring texts previously published in magazines.
 
 Livro de Crónicas (1998)
 Segundo Livro de Crónicas (2002) 
 Terceiro Livro de Crónicas (2006) 
 Quarto Livro de Crónicas (2011)  
 Quinto Livro de Crónicas (2013)

Compilations In English

The Fat Man and Infinity & Other Writings (2009), translated by Margaret Jull Costa

Non-canonical works

Published works considered non-canonical by the author himself.

 A História do hidroavião (1994) illustrated by Vitorino
 Letrinhas das Cantigas (Limited Edition 2002)

 D'este viver aqui neste papel descripto: cartas da guerra ("Cartas da Guerra") (2005) - This book is the collection of war letters written by Lobo Antunes, while on military duties in Angola, to his then wife. They were reorganized by their daughters, with no intervention whatsoever from the author for this publication. The 2016 film Letters from War directed by Ivo M. Ferreira is based on the letter collection.

References

External links

 António Lobo Antunes, official site
 Biography from the Berlin International Literature Festival

1942 births
Living people
People from Lisbon
Portuguese male novelists
Portuguese medical writers
Camões Prize winners
Jerusalem Prize recipients